, also known as The Asahi Picture News, was a Japanese weekly pictorial magazine that ran from 1923 until 2000.

Asahi Graph started on 25 January 1923 as a daily feature from Asahi Shinbunsha (publisher of Asahi Shimbun and soon also of Asahi Camera); this ran until 1 September 1923 when it was stopped by the major earthquake in Tokyo. It was back as a weekly from 14 November. In 1926 it was joined by Asahi Graphic (朝日グラフィック) which the Osaka branch of Asahi Shinbunsha had been publishing since 2 January 1921.

Asahi Graph survived World War II and reemerged as something of a Japanese equivalent of the US magazine Life. (Mainichi Graph, from Asahi's rival Mainichi Shinbunsha, was similar.) The last regular issue of the magazine is dated 13 October 2000.

References

Shirayama Mari. "Major Photography Magazines". In The History of Japanese Photography, ed. Ann Wilkes Tucker, et al. New Haven: Yale University Press, 2003. . pp. 378–85. pp. 379–80.
Shirayama Mari (白山眞理). Nihon no shashin/kamera zasshi (日本の写真・カメラ雑誌). Nihon shashin-shi gaisetsu (日本写真史概説, "An outline history of photography in Japan"). Tokyo: Iwanami, 1999. . pp. 38–9.

External links

1923 establishments in Japan
2000 disestablishments in Japan
Asahi Shimbun Company
Defunct magazines published in Japan
Magazines established in 1923
Magazines disestablished in 2000
Weekly magazines published in Japan
Magazines published in Tokyo
Mass media in Osaka